Belvidere Township is one of nine townships in Boone County, Illinois, United States.  As of the 2020 census, its population was 29,441 and it contained 11,356 housing units.

Geography

Cities
 Belvidere (southeast three-quarters)
 Cherry Valley (west quarter)
 Loves Park (west edge)
 Poplar Grove (northeast quarter)

Unincorporated towns
 Edgewood
 Prairie View
(This list is based on USGS data and may include former settlements.)

Cemeteries
The township contains these four cemeteries: Belvidere, Highland Garden of Memories, Orth and Saint James Catholic.

Major highways
  Interstate 90
  US Route 20
  Illinois State Route 76

Airports and landing strips
 Belvidere Assembly Plant Heliport
 Belvidere Limited Airport
 Poplar Grove Airport

Rivers
 Kishwaukee River

Landmarks
 Belvidere Landing Strp

Demographics
As of the 2020 census there were 29,441 people, 10,814 households, and 7,386 families residing in the township. The racial makeup of the township was 69.04% White, 2.51% African American, 1.17% Native American, 1.20% Asian, 0.06% Pacific Islander, 13.70% from other races, and 12.33% from two or more races. Hispanic or Latino of any race were 27.85% of the population.

There were 10,814 households, out of which 32.40% had children under the age of 18 living with them, 48.88% were married couples living together, 14.49% had a female householder with no spouse present, and 31.70% were non-families. 27.30% of all households were made up of individuals, and 15.90% had someone living alone who was 65 years of age or older. The average household size was 2.70 and the average family size was 3.28.

The township's age distribution consisted of 24.1% under the age of 18, 9.3% from 18 to 24, 22.5% from 25 to 44, 26% from 45 to 64, and 18.0% who were 65 years of age or older. The median age was 39.9 years. For every 100 females, there were 93.5 males. For every 100 females age 18 and over, there were 93.4 males.

The median income for a household in the township was $61,338, and the median income for a family was $77,060. Males had a median income of $40,767 versus $27,764 for females. The per capita income for the township was $31,460. About 6.7% of families and 11.5% of the population were below the poverty line, including 15.1% of those under age 18 and 7.9% of those age 65 or over.

School districts
 Belvidere Consolidated Unit School District 100
 North Boone Community Unit School District 200

Political districts
 Illinois' 16th congressional district
 State House District 69
 State Senate District 35

References
 
 United States Census Bureau 2007 TIGER/Line Shapefiles
 United States National Atlas

External links
 City-Data.com
 Illinois State Archives

Townships in Boone County, Illinois
Populated places established in 1849
Townships in Illinois
1849 establishments in Illinois